
Hebei is a province in China.

Hebei ( unless otherwise noted) may also refer to:

Places in People's Republic of China
Hebei District, an urban district of Tianjin

Towns
Hebei, Beijing, in Fangshan District, Beijing
Hebei, Luobei County (鹤北), in Luobei County, Heilongjiang
Hebei, Shaanxi, in Long County, Shaanxi
Hebei, Shanxi, in Yangcheng County, Shanxi

Townships
Hebei Township, Heilongjiang, in Keshan County, Heilongjiang
Hebei Township, Liaoning, in Fushun, Liaoning
Hebei Township, Qinghai, in Tongde County, Qinghai

Subdistricts
Hebei Subdistrict, Gongzhuling, in Gongzhuling, Jilin
Hebei Subdistrict, Jiaohe, in Jiaohe, Jilin
Hebei Subdistrict, Fuxin, in Haizhou District, Fuxin, Liaoning
Hebei Subdistrict, Ya'an, in Yucheng District, Ya'an, Sichuan

Historical regions
Heshuo, also named Hebei, an ancient Chinese term referring to areas north of the Yellow River
Hebei Circuit, a major administrative division during the Tang, Five Dynasties and Song dynasties

See also
Hebei people, Mandarin-speaking people of North China from Hebei province
2505 Hebei, main-belt asteroid